Suicide Vampire is the fourth album from the Italian gothic black metal band Theatres des Vampires. The Theatres des Vampires drummer Gabriel Valerio was unavailable during the recording of the album, so the drums were recorded by Nick A. for this album.

Track listing

Personnel 
Alexander − vocals
Fabian − keyboards, samples, backing vocals and orchestral arrangements
Alex − lead guitar
Robert − rhythm guitar, extra guitar arrangements
Zimon − bass
Scarlet − backing vocals
Justine − backing vocals
Nick A. − drums (session)

Guest members
Maestro Dimitri - strings
Maestro Mc Bor - orchestral arrangements

Theatres des Vampires albums
2002 albums